William Hurlbut may refer to:

William H. Hurlbut (1837–after 1900), American State Assemblyman in Wisconsin
William Hurlbut (1878–1957), American screenwriter for Bride of Frankenstein
William B. Hurlbut (born 1945), American professor at Stanford's Neuroscience Institute